Rohozná is a municipality and village in Svitavy District in the Pardubice Region of the Czech Republic. It has about 600 inhabitants.

Administrative parts
The village of Manova Lhota is an administrative part of Rohozná.

References

Villages in Svitavy District